Yusuf Ali Nur (born 11 October 1978) is a Somalian professional football coach and former player who played as an attacking midfielder. He recently coached Dekedaha.

Yusuf started his career at HACHS before establishing himself as one of the best players in the Somali Premier League. In 1997, he moved to Elman where he won three consecutive league titles. Yusuf Ali was also the captain of the Somalia national team from 1997 up to 2010.

In 2010, after retiring as a player, Ali Nur transitioned into coaching, and began his head coaching career at Elman, In his several seasons as Elman coach, Ali Nur won two league titles and a Somalia Super Cup.

Club career 
Ali Nur joined Elman in 1997 after leaving his former team HACHS. He played for Elman from 1997 up his retirement in 2010.

He was the captain of Elman fom 2005 up to 2010; Ali Nur led the team into several CAF tournaments.

Managerial career 
After coaching the Somalia national team, Ali Nur joined his former team Elman as coach and won two league titles and a super cup.

In 2015, Ali Nur left Elman and joined Dekedaha, where he continued winning titles: he won three consecutive titles with in 2017, 2018 and 2019.

After five years with Dekedaha, Ali Nur returned to Elman as a technical director in 2021.

References

External links 

 

1978 births
Living people
Somalian footballers
Association football midfielders
Elman FC players
Somali First Division players
Somalia international footballers
Somalian football managers
Somalia national football team managers
Elman FC managers
Dekedaha FC managers
Somali First Division managers